Rich Donovan is a global expert in business development issues surrounding disability and accessibility. He is best known for creating financial instruments that track the intersection of corporate profitability with corporate commitment to disability hiring and best practices. His Return On Disability Index is reported on Bloomberg and has been used as the basis of an Exchange Traded Note (ETN) by Barclay’s Bank on the NYSE Arca Stock Exchange.

Accessibility and finance work

Development of the Return on Disability Index
Donovan is a founder of several research and advisory companies that have foregrounded the business case for companies and governments to act on the disability market. In 2008, he founded what is now called The Return on Disability Group to build metric and models that allow for analysis of corporate activity which help assess how well businesses engage customers and employees with disabilities. The organization’s "Return on Disability Reports" and other models helps companies understand their performance across disability factors that are linked directly to profitability. As well they produce the Return on Disability Indices for the U.S. and Canada markets. These financial tools "recognize public companies that are outperforming in the disability market."  The RoD US 100 and the RoD Canada 50, are published daily by Bloomberg LP. The indices track the shares of the 100 firms that deal best with disabled people. The Economist notes that in the five years to 2012 the US index had outperformed the broader stock market.

LIME
In 2006, Donovan founded Lime Connect, an organization whose goal is to find employment for people with disabilities. The idea with Lime Connect is: “to connect with the brightest people with disabilities from all disciplines. Results have been stellar, with the Lime Connect Fellowship Program placing 20 young stars in 2011 alone, six of whom were hired by Google.” Other companies Lime has partnered with include PepsiCo, Bank of America/Merrill Lynch, IBM, and TD Bank.

Fundamental concepts
As one of the early progenitors of the business case for accessibility, Donovan has focused on the following:

 Strategic road maps for companies to do accessibility well. What works within their strategic frameworks.
 What accessibility practices drive value at specific companies that, in turn, drive investor returns
 the notion of Shared value so that the next ten years of growth will come from non-traditional markets such as people with disabilities

Education
Donovan received his BBA in Finance from the Schulich School of Business at York University (1993 - 1997) and his MBA from Columbia Business School (2000 – 2002). He worked successfully as a trader for Merrill Lynch. Donovan is an avid sailor and father of a son, Maverick, along with his wife, Jenn. He has cerebral palsy.

Honors and awards
 Queen Elizabeth II Diamond Jubilee Medal, Chancellery of Honours, Office of the Secretary to the Governor General of Canada, February 2013.
 Lieutenant Governor’s Community Volunteer Award, Lieutenant Governor of Ontario, August 2014.
 Leadership in Diversity and Inclusion, Merrill Lynch & Co, April 2006.
 Champion of Change, Bubel-Aiken Foundation, October 2008.
 Corbett Ryan Pathways Pioneer Award.
 American Academy for Cerebral Palsy and Developmental Medicine, Pathways.org, October 2013.
 Life Without Limits Award for Excellence, United Cerebral Palsy Associations Inc, April 2008.

Volunteer experience and causes
 Vice President - Board of Directors Cerebral Palsy International Research Foundation, January 2007 – Present.
 1997 Candidate for Federal Parliament -York West Conservative Party of Canada, May 1997.
 Member, Board of Trustees United Cerebral Palsy, January 2008 – September 2014. 
 Member, Investment Committee - United Cerebral Palsy, January 2008 – Present.

Publications
The primary annual report published by The Return on Disability Group is the "Global Economics of Disability". The report "is featured on the European Union web site and is frequently quoted by businesses, governments and NGOs when defining the size, scope and value of the disability market."

References

Accessibility
Derivatives (finance)
Disability studies academics
Founders of charities
Year of birth missing (living people)
Living people